Bulbophyllum pendulum is a species of orchid.

pendulum